Mallow United F.C. is an Irish football club currently fielding teams in the Munster Senior League and the Cork Schoolboys League.

History

1926-1935

Founding of the Club
Mallow United F.C. was formed at a meeting held in the Central Hotel on 11 November 1926.

Present at this meeting were: F.G. Ward, Bridge Street; F.J. Farelly, Bridge Street; J. O'Keeffe, Bridge Street; L. Ward, Bridge Street; S. Grogan, Main St.; W.J. Robinson and G.A. Robinson, Spa Square; C. Davis, Main St; D Burns, Ballydaheen; F. Clune, Fair Street; J. Hartnett, Spa Walk; L. Kennan, Humes Lane; G. Byrne, Bank Place; W. Sheehan, Main Street (Bakery).

At this meeting the first officers were elected as follows:
Chairman: F.G. Ward,
Secretary:  W.J. Robinson,
Treasurer: G.A. Robinson,

It was decided to enter a team in the Munster Junior and F.A.I. Cups. The appointment of a selection committee and team captain would be made at a later meeting. The club colours would be black and red. A club membership fee of 2/6 (12p) a year and a weekly charge of 3d to be collected on Sundays.

First Recorded Fixtures
The second meeting was held on 24 November 1926 at 119 Main St. At this meeting arrangements were made for the first match for a Mallow United team who were to play Sunnyside Rovers. The team selected for this historic fixture were: G. Robinson, J. Hartnett, W. Robinson, F. Mahony, C. Davis, D. Burns. G. Kennedy, P. McDermott, Wm Conway, F.G Ward, T. Crowley. Team captain would be F.G. Ward.

Mallow United played Glenview in the FAI Junior Cup on 20 January 1927.  The Mallow team was: G.A. Robinson, F. Mahony, W.J. Robinson. W. Conway, F.G. Ward (Captain) C. Davis (Vice-captain), D. Burns, G.Kennedy, J.C. Kelly, P. McDermott and J. Hartnett.

Mallow's 1st round Munster Junior Cup match on 20 February 1927 was against Sunnyside Rovers with Mallow losing the game with a score of 5 goals to 2. The team line up for the game was G.A. Robinson. G. Kennedy, W.J. Robinson. F.O'Mahony, C. Davis, J. Matthews, F.G.Ward (Captain) D. Burns, J.J. McDermott, W. Conway and R. Lenihan.  The three substitutes listed for the match were J.J. Hartnett, E. Hanley and A. Callaghan.

By this time, the committee had appointed Major Godfrey, Dr. E. F. O' Connor and Mr. G. Kennedy as team coaches. The committee was also active in trying to secure the Fair Field as a playing pitch from Mr. W. Priestley.

Earliest League Campaigns
The earliest recorded team to take part in the Munster Junior League was the team that played Central United on Sunday 30 September 1928. The Munster Junior League was made up of the following teams: Cork Bohemians, Fordsons, Bridewell, Barracton, Cork City, Cork Celtic, G.S.R. Fermoy, Cobh Ramblers, Southern Rovers, Gratton Rangers, Springfield, Burtonville, Tramways, Dwyers, Bellville, Ardfallen, Central United, Glenview, Rockmount, and Victoria Celtic.

After only one year in football the Mallow United decided to step up from Junior football and enter the Munster Senior League. This indeed was a major step for a club that was founded only the year before, but reflected the ambition of the club. The League had the following members: Barrackton United, Bohemians, Cahir Park, Cobh Ramblers, Cork Celtic, Cork City, Fermoy, Waterford Celtic, and Mallow.

Mallow found the going tough from the start of the season and failed to make an impression and after one season dropped back down to Junior football where they were later to join the North Munster League. Surprisingly it would be another sixty years before the North Cork town would play senior football again when Mallow United would once again join the Munster Senior League. The league was won by Waterford Celtic with Cork Celtic as runners-up.

Windsor Park
Further evidence of the ambition of the club committee is illustrated by the decision to embark on a trip north to Belfast to play Craigavad F.C. Arrangements for the trip were made by Mr. William Girvan who worked for a manufacturing stationery company Wm Ritchie & Sons  Ltd of Elder St.,  Edinburgh.  In the course of his business trips south he would call to Robinsons Bros, Grocers, Main Street, Mallow.  W.J. Robinson was Hon. Secretary of Mallow United while his brother G.A. Robinson was Hon. Treasurer.

Mallow traveled north and played this historic match at Windsor Park.  Coming so close to the political strife of the time, the fixture was an example of sport winning over political divisions. A return match was arranged for Easter Monday 1928 in the Town Park in Mallow. Craigavad F.C. traveled to Mallow on Easter Sunday and stayed in the Central Hotel. For the Mallow United v Craigavad match in March 1928 the team was: Sonny O'Neill, Bill Robinson, Fred Ward, Jimmy Wrixon, Chris Davis, Paddy Waters, Jack Golden, Sonny O'Riordan, George Byrne, Matt Culloty, Joe Weir.

Honours
Munster Senior League
Junior First Division Champions 07/08
Junior Super Cup Winners 08/09

External links
Official website
Munster Senior League website
Cork Schoolboys League website

References 

Association football clubs in County Cork
Mallow, County Cork
1926 establishments in Ireland
Munster Senior League (association football) clubs
Former Cork Athletic Union League clubs
Association football clubs established in 1926